Lenílson Porto Peixoto, shortly Lenílson (born October 9, 1983) is a Brazilian footballer who currently plays for Sem Clube.

References

External links
 Lenílson at ZeroZero
 

1983 births
Living people
Footballers from Rio de Janeiro (city)
Brazilian footballers
Brazilian expatriate footballers
Expatriate footballers in Kuwait
Brazilian expatriate sportspeople in Kuwait
Association football midfielders
America Football Club (RJ) players
Uberlândia Esporte Clube players
Clube Esportivo Lajeadense players
Sociedade Esportiva e Recreativa Caxias do Sul players
Esporte Clube Passo Fundo players
Guarani Esporte Clube (CE) players
Central Sport Club players
Cianorte Futebol Clube players
Brusque Futebol Clube players
Al-Arabi SC (Kuwait) players
Clube Atlético Hermann Aichinger players
Kuwait Premier League players